The sagittal plane (also known as the longitudinal plane) is an anatomical plane that divides the body into right and left sections. It is perpendicular to the transverse and coronal planes. The plane may be in the center of the body and divide it into two equal parts (mid-sagittal), or away from the midline and divide it into unequal parts (para-sagittal).

The term sagittal was coined by Gerard of Cremona.

Variations in terminology
Examples of sagittal planes include:
 The terms median plane or mid-sagittal plane are sometimes used to describe the sagittal plane running through the midline. This plane cuts the body into halves (assuming bilateral symmetry), passing through midline structures such as the navel and spine. It is one of the planes which, combined with the Umbilical plane, defines the four quadrants of the human abdomen.
 The term parasagittal is used to describe any plane parallel or adjacent to a given sagittal plane. Specific named parasagittal planes include:
 The midclavicular line crosses through the clavicle.
 Lateral sternal and parasternal planes.

The term sagittal is derived from the Latin word sagitta, meaning "arrow". An image of an arrow piercing a body and passing from front (anterior) to back (posterior) on a parabolic trajectory would be one way to demonstrate the derivation of the term. Another explanation would be the notching of the sagittal suture posteriorly by the lambdoidal suture —similar to feathers on an arrow.
 Sagittal axis or anterior-posterior axis is the axis perpendicular to the coronal plane, i.e., the one formed by the intersection of the sagittal and the transversal planes
 Coronal axis, medial-lateral axis, or frontal axis is the axis perpendicular to the sagittal plane, i.e., the one formed by the intersection of the coronal and the transversal planes.
 Extension and flexion are the movements of limbs within the sagittal plane.
 Abduction and adduction'' are terms for movements of limbs within the coronal plane.
 Sagittal plane movements include flexion, extension, and hyperextension, as well as dorsiflexion and plantar flexion.

Additional images

See also
 Anatomical terms of location
 Coronal plane
 Transverse plane

References

Anatomical planes